Beast from the East is a live album recorded by the American heavy metal band Dokken in Japan in April 1988, during tour in support of their album Back for the Attack. It was released on November 16, 1988. The album features live versions of the band's most popular songs from previous four studio albums and also includes a new studio track entitled "Walk Away". The song was accompanied with a music video, which featured members of the band performing atop the Santa Monica Mountains overlooking Topanga Canyon and the Pacific Ocean. The album earned the band their only Grammy Award nomination for the Best Metal Performance in 1990, losing to Metallica's "One".

Background
Up to 1988, Dokken had released four studio albums, of which the last three were certified platinum. The band opened for Judas Priest, Aerosmith and several other bands, which eventually gained the band a spot on the Monsters of Rock Tour 1988 festival, where they played with Metallica, Scorpions, Kingdom Come and the headliner, Van Halen. They also recorded a song "Dream Warriors" for the movie A Nightmare on Elm Street 3: Dream Warriors. Prior to the Monsters of Rock fest, the band went on to tour in Japan, where they recorded several shows of the tour. Those recordings were released as their first live album called Beast from the East, with an additional new song called "Walk Away". While not as successful as the band's previous release, Back for the Attack, Beast from the East entered Billboard Top 40, achieving gold certificate. In 1990, it was nominated to the Grammy Award for Best Metal Performance, the only Dokken album to receive one. However, the band was involved in controversy when Chris Cornell of Soundgarden, who was in direct competition with Dokken in the "Metal" category stated, "I have no idea why they call Dokken metal and put them in the same category we're in." To date, Beast from the East is the last Dokken album to receive a certification by RIAA.

US CD  track listing

Japan & original U.S. cassette & LP version track listing

Sides 1-2

Sides 3-4

Personnel
Don Dokken - lead vocals
George Lynch - lead guitar
Jeff Pilson - bass guitar, keyboards, backing vocals
Mick Brown - drums, backing vocals

Charts

Album

Single(s)
"Walk Away"

Sales and recognition

|-
| style="text-align:center;"| 1990 || Beast from the East || Best Metal Performance||

References

Dokken live albums
1988 live albums
Elektra Records live albums